White Ant (Chinese: 白蟻─慾望謎網) is a 2016 Taiwanese drama film and the narrative feature film debut of Chu Hsien-che, who worked as a documentarian for more than 20 years prior to White Ant. The film stars Wu Kang-jen, Aviis Zhong and Yu Tai-yan.

Premise
Bai Yide is a young bookstore worker living alone in a Taipei neighborhood. Unknown to anyone else, the socially inept Bai has an uncontrollable fetish for women's underwear due to a traumatic past event. One day, he receives a video recording of himself caught in the act of stealing female lingerie, leading to a gradually accumulating sense of anxiety and fear of exposure with tragic consequences.

Cast
Wu Kang-jen as Bai Yide
Aviis Zhong as Tang Junhong
Yu Tai-yan as Lan Tangyuan, Bai Yide's mother

Reception
Elizabeth Kerr of The Hollywood Reporter stated, "Carefully modulated and wisely attuned to its strongest elements, White Ant is evidence of Chu's doc background, both in style and substance." She concluded that the film is "a strong exploration of the psychological impact of shame, fear and guilt".

Awards and nominations

References

External links
 

2016 films
Taiwanese drama films
2010s Mandarin-language films
2016 drama films